The North Carolina–NC State football rivalry is an American college football rivalry between the North Carolina Tar Heels football team of the University of North Carolina at Chapel Hill and the NC State Wolfpack football team of North Carolina State University. Both universities are members of the Atlantic Coast Conference (ACC) and are permanent cross-division opponents. North Carolina leads the all-time series 68–38–6 (.634). The Wolfpack have won 5 of the last 7 and 11 of the last 16 in the series. NC State won the most recent contest, 30–27 in double overtime, on November 25, 2022. It is annually anticipated as the biggest college football game in the state of North Carolina. Only twice in the history of the rivalry has the game been contested anywhere beside Chapel Hill or Raleigh.  The game has been played 60 times in Chapel Hill, 50 times in Raleigh, and twice in Charlotte, North Carolina (1998 and 1999). Played uninterrupted since 1953, the game since 1965 has alternated annually between the two respective campuses (save for the aforementioned 1998 & 1999 games). Games in odd-numbered years are played in Raleigh at NC State, and even-numbered years in Chapel Hill at UNC.

Pre–ACC era

The first game between North Carolina and NC State occurred October 12, 1894 in Chapel Hill, North Carolina. The Tar Heels won 44–0, the first of six straight victories for North Carolina to open the series with NC State. The Wolfpack tied North Carolina four times between 1899 and 1905 before the series went on a fourteen-year hiatus, with North Carolina leading 8–0–4. Following a 0–0 tie on November 8, 1902, the student body of Trinity College sent NC State a congratulatory telegram, showing the significance of another intense regional rivalry between then-Trinity and North Carolina despite Trinity (Duke) having no football team at the time.

The two rivals met again on October 23, 1919, and North Carolina narrowly escaped with a one-point victory. On October 21, 1920 in Raleigh, North Carolina, which was the fourteenth meeting between the schools, the Wolfpack won for the first time. NC State backed up the win with another victory the following season. The Tar Heels dominated the pre–ACC series with a 31–5–6 record.

ACC era

North Carolina and NC State were both charter members of the Atlantic Coast Conference, which played its first season in 1953. Since that year, the rivalry has been played every season without a break. NC State hired Earle Edwards as head coach in 1954, and he was able to have considerable more success against North Carolina than his predecessors. Edwards amassed a 6–3 record against North Carolina during that time period and a 9–8 record during his career as head coach of the Wolfpack, making him the winningest NC State coach against the Tar Heels.

In the first 26 seasons of the ACC, the series record was tied at 13. Beginning in 1979, North Carolina went on a seven-game winning streak. During this time, North Carolina head coach Dick Crum amassed an 8–2 record against the Wolfpack. NC State hired Dick Sheridan as head coach prior to the 1986 season, and he went 6–1 against the Tar Heels. Following Sheridan's retirement from coaching, North Carolina went on another seven-game winning streak, leaving NC State head coach Mike O'Cain winless against Tar Heels coaches Mack Brown and Carl Torbush. The 1998 and 1999 games were held at Bank of America Stadium in Charlotte, NC, with the Tar Heels victorious in both. During the 2000s, NC State went 6–4 in the series, including winning the last three games of the decade under Tom O'Brien. From 2000–2022, NC State leads 14–9. The series record in the ACC currently stands at 37–33 in favor of North Carolina. Mack Brown is 7–7 against NC State as head coach of the Tar Heels, while his overall record against NC State as a head coach is 7–9 (UNC-Chapel Hill, Texas, and Appalachian State).  NC State head coach Dave Doeren is currently 6–4 against UNC-Chapel Hill, including a 4–1 record in Kenan Stadium.

Game results

See also 
 List of NCAA college football rivalry games
 List of most-played college football series in NCAA Division I
 North Carolina–NC State rivalry

References

College football rivalries in the United States
NC State Wolfpack football
North Carolina Tar Heels football
1894 establishments in North Carolina